Pyatnitsky (masculine), Pyatnitskaya (feminine), or Pyatnitskoye (neuter) may refer to:
Pyatnitsky (surname) (Pyatnitskaya), Russian last name
Pyatnitsky Choir, Russian musical group
Pyatnitsky (inhabited locality) (Pyatnitskaya, Pyatnitskoye), several inhabited localities in Russia